Nyoshül Khenpo Rinpoche (13 July 1932 – 27 August 1999), more fully Nyoshül Khenpo Jamyang Dorje, was a Tibetan lama born in the Derge region of Kham.

Biography
Nyoshul Khenpo Rinpoche was born in 1932 in the Derge region of Kham, Tibet. At the age of five, Rinpoche was taken to a Sakya monastery where he had his hair cut and was given a refuge name. At age eight, he was enrolled in the monastery and began his Buddhist studies. At age eighteen, he studied Longchen Nyingthig teachings and Dzogchen at the Nyoshul monastery. At the time of 1959 Tibetan uprising, when he was twenty-seven, under fire from the Chinese, he fled to India with 70 people, but only 5 arrived.

In India, Rinpoche studied under the second Dudjom Rinpoche (Jigdral Yeshe Dorje), Dilgo Khyentse Rinpoche, and the sixteenth Karmapa (Rangjung Rigpe Dorje).

Some of Rinpoche's students include Surya Das and Sogyal Rinpoche.

Bibliography

References

External links
Nyoshul Khenpo Rinpoche - at Rigpa Wiki

1932 births
1999 deaths
20th-century lamas
Lamas from Tibet
Buddhist monks from Tibet
Rinpoches
Nyingma lamas
Dzogchen lamas
20th-century Buddhist monks